Mailani Junction railway station is an important railway station in Lucknow NER Division Of Indian Railways. This junction is an important station of Lucknow-Sitapur-Lakhimpur-Pilibhit-Bareilly-Kasganj rail line and Mailani Junction-Bahraich MG Section.  Its code is MLN. It serves Mailani. This junction has both BG and MG tracks. The BG station has 3 platforms and 7 tracks out of which 4 tracks are turminated tracks. The MG station has 4 platforms and 9 tracks. The platforms are well sheltered but lack many facilities, including water and sanitation.

Trains
 Mailani Jn- Bahraich Passenger
 Lucknow-Mailani Unreserved Express
 Mailani-Gorakhpur Gomtinagar Express
 Gorakhpur–Mailani Express

References

Railway stations in Lakhimpur Kheri district
Lucknow NER railway division